Guéguéré is a department or commune of Ioba Province in Burkina Faso.

References 

Departments of Burkina Faso
Ioba Province